This is a list of settlements in Worcestershire by population based on the results of the 2011 census. The next United Kingdom census will take place in 2021. In 2011, there were 11 built-up area subdivisions with 5,000 or more inhabitants in Worcestershire, shown in the table below.



Population ranking

See also 

 Worcestershire

References

External links 
 Link to ONS built up area statistics

population
settlements
Worcestershire